Folketeatret is a theatre in Copenhagen, Denmark. The theatre was founded in 1857, after an initiative from actor and theater director   Hans Wilhelm Lange (1815-1873) who managed the theater until his death in 1873. 
Folketeatret is now operated as a part of the Københavns Teater in affiliation  with the Betty Nansen Teatret, Østre Gasværk Teater and Nørrebros Theater.

References

External links 
 Folketeatret Official site

Theatres in Copenhagen
Culture in Copenhagen
Buildings and structures in Copenhagen
1857 establishments in Denmark